HNoMS Otra was an Otra-class minesweeper built in 1939 for the Royal Norwegian Navy. Captured by the Germans during the 1940 invasion of Norway and renamed Togo, she was returned to the Norwegians in 1946. Otra remained in service until being sold for scrapping in 1963.

Description
Otra and her sister ship Rauma were two purpose-built minesweepers constructed at Nylands Verksted in Oslo. Both ships were completed and commissioned only a short time before the German invasion of Norway. The Otra class vessels used the Oropesa system of mine sweeping. As the threat of war in Europe became ever more clear the decision was made to improve the Royal Norwegian Navy's mine warfare capabilities. At first a number of 2. class gunboats were rebuilt into minelayers and mine sweepers, but with war looming it soon became clear that more capable vessels were required.

The invasion

Prelude
Shortly before the German invasion the UK announced that the Royal Navy had laid a number of minefields along the coast of Norway to interfere with the German import of Swedish iron ore through the North Norwegian port of Narvik. The British government claimed to have mined three areas; off Stad, Hustadvika, and Landegode north of Bodø. In response to this report, the Norwegian government ordered the minesweepers Otra and Rauma to sail north from their base in Horten and sweep the minefields on 9 April 1940.

Otra spots the invasion force
Before the order to go north could be carried out, however, the German invasion of Norway took place in the early hours of 9 April. As reports of intruding warships started coming in Otra was sent out to investigate, and at 0410hrs report that the intruders were Germans. The invasion flotilla blocked Otras return to Horten.

Capture
While her sister ship, HNoMS Rauma, was fighting the German naval forces in Horten Otra was cut off and isolated from the action. The next morning, 10 April, she was captured while at anchor in Filtvet.

German service as Togo

After capture Otra was renamed Togo and put in service as a Vorpostenboot and minelayer for the rest of the war. First NT 05 Togo served in as part of Hafenschutzflotille Tromsø guarding that northern city's harbour. Later she was transferred to Hafenschutzflottille Oslo. Also in 1941, she became part of 59th Vorpostenflottille as V 5908 Togo, where she served until April 1944 when she transferred to 65th Vorpostenflottille as V 6512 Togo. After the German surrender she was part of the German Mine Sweeping Administration (GM-SA).

Post-war service
On 18 January 1946 Togo was returned to the Royal Norwegian Navy at Bogen and on 30 October 1946 was renamed HNoMS Otra'''''. In April 1949 she was rebuilt as a minelayer training ship. 21 August 1959 saw her decommissioning and she was laid up at Horten until put out of service and sold in April 1963.

Footnotes

Bibliography
 
 

Minesweepers of the Royal Norwegian Navy
Ships built in Oslo
1939 ships
World War II minesweepers of Norway
Naval ships of Norway captured by Germany during World War II
Minelayers of the Kriegsmarine
World War II minelayers of Germany
Training ships of the Royal Norwegian Navy